Magnús is a 1989 Icelandic film directed by Þráinn Bertelsson.

Cast 
Egill Ólafsson - Magnús Bertelsson
Laddi - Theódór Ólafsson
Guðrún Gísladóttir - Helena Ólafsdóttir
Jón Sigurbjörnsson - Ólafur Theódórsson
Margrét Ákadóttir - Laufey Hrímfjörð
María Ellingsen - Edda Magnúsdóttir

External links
 

1989 films
Icelandic comedy-drama films
Films directed by Þráinn Bertelsson